Parkmore Shopping Centre is a regional shopping centre located in the outer south-eastern suburb of Keysborough in the city of Melbourne, Australia. The centre services the suburbs of the City of Greater Dandenong such as Keysborough, Noble Park, Springvale as well as other local suburbs. There are 128 stores at Parkmore along with 2,600 car parking spaces, 130 of which are located undercover.

History
Opening on 27 November 1973, the centre held extravagant opening celebrations, including Santa Claus arriving in the world's largest hot air balloon of the time, as well as a performance by John Farnham.

Anchors

Kmart discount department store.
Big W discount department store.
Coles supermarket.
Woolworths supermarket.
Best & Less clothing store.

Transport
Parkmore provides free parking for approximately 2600 vehicles and is serviced by five bus routes and taxis.

The centre is surrounded on all sides except the east side by ground level uncovered parking. Rooftop parking is provided with two separate carparks on top of Coles and Kmart.  Limited undercover parking is available near Coles.

References 

Shopping centres in Melbourne
Shopping malls established in 1973
Buildings and structures in the City of Greater Dandenong
1973 establishments in Australia